"I Feel Lonely" is a song recorded by German singer Sasha. It was written by Sasha, Michael "Grant Michael B." Kersting, and Stephan "Pomez di Lorenzo" Baader for Sasha's debut studio album Dedicated to... (1998), while production was overseen by the latter two. Released as the album's fourth and final single, the reggae-influenced mid-tempo track became a top ten success in Belgium, Finland, Germany, and Switzerland.

In 2014, a jazzy cover version of the song, recorded by Sarah Connor, reached number 44 on the Austrian Singles Chart after her performance on the reality television series Sing meinen Song – Das Tauschkonzert, the German version of The Best Singers series, in which she appeared with Sasha.

Credits and personnel 
Credits adapted from the liner notes of Dedicated to...

Music and lyrics – Pomez di Lorenzo, Grant Michael B.
Lead and backing vocals – Sasha
Mixing – Falk Moller, Michael B.

Charts

Weekly charts

Year-end charts

Certifications

References

External links 
 

1999 singles
1998 songs
Sasha (German singer) songs
Warner Music Group singles